Mammilloydia is a genus of cactus containing the sole species Mammilloydia candida, the snowball cactus.

Description
Mammilloydia candida is green, globe-shaped, but with age it becomes almost cylindrical. As is usual in the genus Mammillaria, this plant has no ribs. The flowers are pink or white. The plant is covered by fine white hair. The spines are short, very numerous, usually snow white or brown.

Distribution
This species originates from Mexico (Coahuila, Nuevo León, San Luis Potosí and Tamaulipas).

Habitat
The natural habitat of Mammilloydia candida is the desert.

References

 Cacti Guide
 Desert Tropical
 EoL
 Genus Mammilloydia in USDA

Cactoideae genera
Monotypic Cactaceae genera
Cacti of Mexico